QS Telescopii is a faint, well-studied binary star system in the southern constellation Telescopium. It is composed of a white dwarf and main sequence donor star, locked into a close, circular orbit facing one another. Known as polars, material from the donor star does not form an accretion disk around the white dwarf, but rather streams directly onto it. This is due to the presence of the white dwarf's strong magnetic field. The pair undergo frequent shifts between a high and low accretion states, and it shifts between single and double accretion poles. The main pole is partially self-eclipsing.

The pair orbit each other with a period of 2.33 hours in a circular orbit. The donor star is a small red dwarf with an estimated stellar classification of M4−5. The white dwarf primary has 71% of the mass of the Sun and an effective temperature of 17,500 K. It has a magnetic field strength of 50–80 MG. The system is a source for X-ray emission.

See also
 Variable stars
 Polar (cataclysmic variable)
 AM Herculis

References

Further reading

 

 

 

 

 

 

 

 

 

 

 

 

White dwarfs
Polars (cataclysmic variable stars)
Telescopium (constellation)
Telescopii, QS
M-type main-sequence stars